The Union Club of the City of New York (commonly known as the Union Club) is a private social club in New York City that was founded in 1836. The clubhouse is located at 101 East 69th Street on the corner of Park Avenue, in a landmark building designed by Delano & Aldrich that opened on August 28, 1933.

The Union Club is the oldest private club in New York City and the fifth oldest in the United States, after the South River Club in Annapolis, Maryland (between 1700 and 1732), the Schuylkill Fishing Company in Andalusia, Pennsylvania (1732), the Old Colony Club in Plymouth, Massachusetts (1769), and the Philadelphia Club in Philadelphia, Pennsylvania (1834). The Union Club is considered one of the most prestigious clubs in New York City.

Clubhouse 

The current building is the club's sixth clubhouse and the third built specifically for the members. The prior two clubhouses were at Fifth Avenue and 21st Street, occupied from 1855 to 1903; and on the northeast corner of Fifth Avenue and 51st Street, a limestone clubhouse occupied from 1903 to 1933.

In 1927, club members voted to move uptown, to a quieter and less crowded location. They hired architects William Adams Delano and Chester Holmes Aldrich—who had previously designed buildings for the Knickerbocker Club, the Brook Club, and the Colony Club—to design their new clubhouse. The Union moved to its current location in 1933. The building is known for its opulence and idiosyncratic details. At one point the building featured five dining rooms and a humidor with 100,000 cigars. Notable rooms include the card room, the backgammon room, the library, and the lounge (off the squash courts).

History 
The Union Club was founded in 1836 at a meeting held at the home of John McCrackan at 1 Bond Street, and was considered "the most thoroughly aristocratic private institution in the city." The Union Club has been referred to as the "Mother of Clubs" because it was from the Union Club and its membership that many other private clubs in New York and elsewhere have sprung. From the beginning, the Union Club was known for its strongly conservative principles. During the Civil War, the club refused to expel its Confederate members, despite taking a strong line on suppressing anti-draft riots. This policy, and a belief that the Union's admission standards had fallen, led some members of the Union to leave and form other private clubs (including the Union League Club of New York and the Knickerbocker Club).

In 1891, the Metropolitan Club was founded by J.P. Morgan as a direct answer to the Union Club, after many of Morgan's friends were denied entry to the Union Club.

In 1903, The Brook was founded by some prominent members of the Union Club (as well as some members of other New York City private clubs, such as the Knickerbocker Club and Metropolitan Club).

In 1918, the Union began using women waitresses to free male employees for service related to World War I. This was the first time women were officially allowed entrance to the previously male-only enclave.

In 1932, the Union Club boasted 1,300 members. By the 1950s, urban social club membership was dwindling, in large part because of the movement of wealthy families to the suburbs. In 1954, Union Club membership had declined to 950 members. In 1959, the Union Club and the Knickerbocker Club considered merging the Union's 900 men with The Knick's 550 members, but the plan never came to fruition.

The Union Club is one of the few places where the game of bottle pool is still popular.

In popular culture 
 In the 1988 film Working Girl, Tess (Melanie Griffith) and Jack (Harrison Ford) gatecrash the wedding of Oren Trask's (Philip Bosco) daughter at the Union Club, where they pitch their plan to Trask.
 In Season 3, Episode 8 (2012) of HBO's series Boardwalk Empire, titled "The Pony", Nucky Thompson poses as a member of the Kansas City Club to gain access to the Union Club via "a reciprocal agreement" between the two clubs. He then proposes a partnership to Andrew Mellon against Harry Daugherty.

Notable members

 John Jacob Astor IV (1864–1912), millionaire and RMS Titanic victim
 James Gordon Bennett Jr. (1841–1918), publisher of the New York Herald, bon vivant and eponym of the British exclamation "Gordon Bennett!"
 Anthony Joseph Drexel Biddle Jr. (1897–1961), major general in the U.S. Army and U.S. diplomat
 William A. Chanler (1867–1934), explorer, soldier and US Congressman
 Winston Churchill (1871–1947), novelist
 Edward Cooper (1824–1905), mayor of New York City
 Frank Crowninshield (1872–1947), journalist and art and theatre critic
 William Bayard Cutting (1850–1912), attorney, financier, real estate developer, sugar beet refiner and philanthropist
 Dwight D. Eisenhower (1890–1969), thirty-fourth President of the United States
 John Ericsson (1803–1899), inventor and mechanical engineer who designed the USS Monitor
 William M. Evarts (1818–1901), lawyer, US Secretary of State, US Attorney General  and US Senator
 Cyrus West Field (1819–1892), businessman and financier who led the Atlantic Telegraph Company
 Luis de Florez (1889–1962), Rear Admiral in the United States Navy and aerospace pioneer
 Peter Frelinghuysen Jr., member of the U.S. House of Representatives
 Ulysses S. Grant (1822–1885), eighteenth President of the United States
 Ulysses S. Grant III (1881–1968), major general in the U.S. Army
 Andrew Haswell Green (1820–1903), lawyer and city planner
 Moses H. Grinnell (1803–1877), shipper and Central Park commissioner during its design and construction
 Pierpont M. Hamilton (1898–1982), general in the U.S. Army and U.S. Air Force and recipient of the Medal of Honor
 E. H. Harriman (1848–1909), railroad magnate
 Adolphe Meyer Chief of the Union Club, writer, President of the philharmonic association of Philadelphia
 W. Averell Harriman (1891–1986), politician, businessman and diplomat
 William Randolph Hearst (1863–1951), newspaper magnate
 Philip Hone (1780–1851), mayor of New York City and 19th century diarist
 Hugh Alwyn Inness-Brown Sr. (1892–1972), New York publisher and journalist
 J. Bruce Ismay (1862–1937), managing director of the White Star Line and RMS Titanic survivor
 Leonard Jerome (1817–1891), financier and grandfather of Winston Churchill
 Hallett Johnson (1888–1968), diplomate and ambassador to Costa Rica
 Philip Kearny (1815–1862), major general in the United States Army, notable for his leadership in the Mexican–American War and American Civil War
 John Alsop King (1788–1867), governor of New York
 Ward McAllister (1827–1895), self-appointed arbiter of New York society from the 1860s to the early 1890s
 Clement Clarke Moore (1779–1863), professor and credited author of A Visit from St. Nicholas
 J. P. Morgan (1837–1913), financier, banker, philanthropist, and art collector
 Hubertus von Faber-Castell (1934-2007), billionaire industrial heir and Chinese honorary citizen
 Winthrop Rockefeller (1912–1973), Governor of Arkansas
 Winfield Scott (1786–1866), United States Army general
 Philip H. Sheridan (1831–1888), general in the Union Army
 William Tecumseh Sherman (1820–1891), general in the Union Army and businessman, educator, and author
 Leland Stanford (1824–1893), business magnate, politician and founder of Stanford University
 Edwin Augustus Stevens (1795–1868), founder of the Stevens Institute of Technology
 John Cox Stevens (1785–1857), first Commodore of the New York Yacht Club and member of the syndicate that won the first America's Cup trophy in 1851
 A. T. Stewart (1803–1876), retailing pioneer
 Rutherford Stuyvesant (1843–1909), builder of the first apartment building in New York City in 1869
 Eduard von Oppenheim (1831–1909), banker, railway pioneer and legendary horse owner
 Cornelius Vanderbilt (1794–1877), shipping and railroad entrepreneur
 Harold Stirling Vanderbilt (1884–1970), railroad executive, yachtsman and bridge player
 Sumner Welles (1892–1961), government official and diplomat
 George Carroll Whipple III, Society reporter for NY1 and Time Warner Cable News
 Thomas Kennerly Wolfe Jr. [Tom Wolfe] American author and journalist (March 2, 1930 – May 14, 2018)
 James T. Woodward (1837–1910), banker and owner of major thoroughbred horse dynasty

Reciprocities
 Boodle’s (London)
 Garrick Club (London)
 Australian Club (Sydney)
 California Club (Los Angeles)
 Automobile Club de France (Paris)
 Travelers’ Club (Paris)
 Club de la Chase (Paris)
 Philadelphia Club (Philadelphia)
 Jupiter Island Club (Florida)
 Società del Giardino (Milan)
 Rio de Janeiro Club (Rio de Janeiro)
 Pendennis Club (Kentucky)

War records
More than 300 members of the Union Club joined the U.S. military services during World War II. In 1947, the club published Union Club World War II Records 1940 - 1947, recording the military accomplishments of those members who served during the War and who chose to participate in the project.

See also
 List of American gentlemen's clubs

Footnotes

External links 

 
 Images Union Club Of New York At Brick & Cornice
 Architectial essay on 51st Street Location

Gentlemen's clubs in New York City
Park Avenue
Upper East Side
1836 establishments in New York (state)
Delano & Aldrich buildings
Conservative organizations in the United States